Gretel & Hansel (also known as Gretel & Hansel: A Grim Fairy Tale) is a 2020 dark fantasy horror film  based on the German folklore tale "Hansel and Gretel" by the Brothers Grimm. The film is directed by Oz Perkins, and produced by Fred Berger, Brian Kavanaugh-Jones, and Dan Kagan, with a screenplay by Rob Hayes. Sophia Lillis and Sam Leakey portray the titular characters, alongside Alice Krige and Jessica De Gouw. The story follows Gretel and Hansel as they enter the dark woods in order to find work and food, and then stumble upon the home of a witch.

It was announced in October 2018 that Orion Pictures had started developing Gretel & Hansel, a film adaptation based on the German folklore Hansel and Gretel by the Brothers Grimm, with Perkins directing the film from a screenplay he co-wrote with Hayes. At the same time, Lillis was set to star in the film, with other actors being added shortly after, and filming taking place between November and December 2018 in Dublin, Ireland.

Gretel & Hansel was released in North America on 31 January 2020 by Orion Pictures through United Artists Releasing. The film grossed $22 million worldwide and received generally mixed reviews from critics, with praise for its visuals and cinematography, as well as the horror elements and acting, but criticism for the film's slow pacing and screenplay.

Plot
The prologue opens with a story about "A Beautiful Child with a Pretty Pink Hat". A father takes his deathly ill baby daughter to be cured by a witch, who, in doing so, gifts the child with supernatural abilities. As the girl grows, the villagers come to hear her premonitions, but her sinister nature is soon revealed when she begins murdering innocents, including her own father. The girl is then abandoned in the woods, where she lures children to their death.

The scene shifts to teenaged Gretel, who is implied to also have supernatural abilities, and her younger brother, Hansel. As their father has died, their mother sends them out to find work. Gretel is offered a housekeeping job but turns it down when the master of the house asks about her virginity. Their mother rebukes Gretel for not helping provide for them and threatens to kill them if they do not leave the house.

The siblings flee and find a hut to stay for the night, but a ghoulish man appears and attacks Hansel. A huntsman saves the siblings and takes them to his home for the night, before sending them off to find work the next morning. They get lost in the woods and begin to starve. Hansel is lured away to a house by the scent of cake, and Gretel pursues him. A woman named Holda invites the children in for a meal and allows them stay, in exchange for work. Hansel is sent into the woods to practice handling an axe, while Gretel assists with housekeeping. Hansel is happy with their new home, but Gretel is suspicious of Holda and troubled by disturbing visions and nightmares. Sensing Gretel's abilities, Holda initiates her into witchcraft and teaches her to levitate a broom with flying ointment.

Hansel soon becomes wary of Holda after he discovers a satanic pentagram carved into a tree. The siblings argue that night, resulting in Gretel forcing out Hansel, who is then lured into a trap by Holda. Gretel confronts the witch, who insists she is doing the girl a favour by getting rid of Hansel. It is then revealed that Holda was the mother of the child from the story; Holda loathed her daughter for killing her husband. After exiling her daughter into the woods, Holda is haunted by the girl's spirit until she cannibalizes her other children to gain the same power. Holda has been luring children to their deaths in the guise of an elderly woman ever since.

Holda drugs Gretel and straps her down in the cellar, where she intends for her to eat Hansel. Now in the form of a young woman, Holda lures Hansel into a cage atop a large fire pit so she can cook him. Gretel manages to free herself and uses flying ointment on her hands and face to levitate a broom. She pins Holda against the wall, where she slowly burns to death over the fire, awaking Hansel from his trance.

The next morning, Gretel assures her brother that Holda is gone and sends him back home. Their mother is implied to have died and Hansel will work as a woodsman. Gretel stays behind to hone her craft. She sees the spirits of Holda's victims, now finally free to pass on, just as her fingertips begin to turn black, like Holda's.

Cast and characters
 Sophia Lillis as Gretel, a 16-year-old girl and Hansel's older sister.
 Sam Leakey as Hansel, Gretel's 8-year-old brother. Leakey is making his acting debut.
 Alice Krige as Holda / The Witch, a terrifying and powerful evil witch who lives in the shadows of the dark wood and kidnaps Gretel and Hansel.
 Jessica De Gouw as Young Holda / The Witch
 Charles Babalola as Huntsman, a young man who helps Gretel and Hansel early in the story.
 Fiona O'Shaughnessy as Mother
 Donncha Crowley as Master Stripp
 Melody Carrillo as Enchantress
 Jonathan Delaney Tynan as Father
 Jonathan Gunning as Emaciated man
 Ian Kenny as Knight
 Abdul Alshareef as Knight
 Manuel Pombo as Knight
 Loreece Harrison as Demoness
 Giulia Doherty and Beatrix Perkins (uncredited) as The Beautiful Child

Production
In October 2018, the Hollywood Reporter wrote that Orion Pictures had started developing a film adaptation of the German folklore tale Hansel and Gretel, with Oz Perkins directing a screenplay he had co-written with Rob Hayes, and Sophia Lillis starring as the lead character. Sinister producer Brian Kavanaugh-Jones and The Autopsy of Jane Doe producer Fred Berger, partners at Automatik Entertainment, were announced as producers, with Sandra Yee Ling and Macdara Kelleher as executive producers. Hayes eventually received sole screenplay credit.

In November 2018, Charles Babalola was cast as the Hunter, a new character who helps Gretel and Hansel navigate the woods. In April 2019, Alice Krige, Jessica De Gouw, and Sam Leakey joined the cast, with Leakey making his acting debut.

Perkins explained in an interview that the title was changed because this version focuses on Gretel: 

Principal photography on the film began on 9 November 2018 in Dublin, Ireland, and wrapped up in December 2018. Additional filming and reshoots started in January 2019 in Langley, British Columbia, Canada.

Music
The score was composed by Robin Coudert, also known by his stage name, Rob. With the soundtrack in mind, Rob avoided using typical symphonic orchestral themes to create a unique film score saying, “I find it essential to create melodies that we can sing or whistle as, in horror cinema, it is usually the opposite, where the music rather has a tendency toward structure and abstraction. For this project, which is a film about kids, it seemed important to have that.” The soundtrack was released by Waxwork Records in 2020 as a single LP.

Release
The film was released on 31 January 2020 by United Artists.

Home video
Warner Bros. Home Entertainment released the film digitally on 7 April 2020, and on DVD and Blu-ray on 5 May 2020.

Reception

Box office
In the United States and Canada, the film was released alongside The Rhythm Section, and was projected to gross $4–7 million from 3,000 theaters in its opening weekend. The film made $2.3 million on its first day (including $475,000 from Thursday night previews). It debuted to $6.1 million, finishing fourth.

Critical response
On Rotten Tomatoes, the film holds an approval rating of 63% based on 112 reviews, with an average rating of 6.3/10. The site's critical consensus reads: "Gretel & Hansels rich visuals satisfy, even if this adaptation of a classic fairytale gets a little lost in the woods on the storytelling front." On Metacritic, the film has a weighted average score of 64 out of 100, based on 17 critics, indicating "generally favorable reviews". Audiences polled by CinemaScore gave the film an average grade of "C−" on an A+ to F scale.

Contrarily, Andrew Barker of Variety wrote, "The film certainly looks nice, with a wealth of eye-catching compositions," but added, "The problem is that so many of its virtues feel compromised."  Kimber Myers wrote for The Los Angeles Times, "While [Perkins] offers a stunning feast for the eyes, the substance is likely to leave viewers still hungry."

Chandler Levack from The Globe and Mail wrote, "Everything about Gretel & Hansel is weirder, smarter and way more cinematic than I'd expected, thanks to some fascinating movie choices made by director Oz Perkins." Kate Rife from The A.V. Club wrote, "If one of the boundaries being tested in this film is viewers' patience, the reward for—to use a refrain repeated throughout the film—'trusting the darkness' is well worth the commitment." Frank Sheck of The Hollywood Reporter wrote, "Gretel & Hansel may alienate some horror movie fans with its extremely leisurely pacing and emphasis on atmosphere and mood rather than visceral shocks. But while the film certainly demands patience, it provides ample rewards with its lush stylization."

Mark Kennedy of the Associated Press wrote, "Gretel & Hansel is as visually arresting as it is tedious, a 90-minute movie that really should have been a 3-minute music video for Marilyn Manson or Ozzy Osbourne. It's in the horror genre only loosely. It's more eerie, if that's a genre. Actually, it's like dread for 90 minutes. It's dreadful."  Jeannette Catsoulis of The New York Times labeled the film "Essentially the story of a young woman coming into her power, Gretel & Hansel is quietly sinister, yet too underdeveloped to truly scare."

See also
 List of films about witchcraft

References

External links
 
 
 

2020 fantasy films
2020 films
2020 horror films
2020s coming-of-age films
American coming-of-age films
American fantasy films
American supernatural horror films
Canadian supernatural horror films
American dark fantasy films
2020s English-language films
English-language Canadian films
English-language Irish films
Films about cannibalism
Films about witchcraft
Films based on Hansel and Gretel
Films directed by Oz Perkins
Films scored by Robin Coudert
Films set in forests
Films shot in Ireland
Films shot in Dublin (city)
Folk horror films
Irish supernatural horror films
Orion Pictures films
Metro-Goldwyn-Mayer films
Bron Studios films
2020s Canadian films
2020s American films
Horror films based on children's franchises